Palangan (also Romanized as Palangān) is a village in Berentin Rural District, Bikah District, Rudan County, Hormozgan Province, Iran. At the 2006 census, its population was 25, in 6 families.

References 

Populated places in Rudan County